Jessy Chahal (Full name: Jasminder Kaur Chahal, born 24 November) is a local celebrity in Malaysia. She is an actress, TV host and Emcee. She is also the title holder of Miss Malaysia India Worldwide 2002.

See also
 Sikhism in Malaysia

External links
Web/News

 
 
 

Living people
Year of birth missing (living people)